In music theory, a comma pump (or comma drift) is a sequence of notes, often a chord progression, where the pitch shifts up or down by a comma (a small interval) every time the sequence is traversed. Comma pumps often arise from a sequence of just intervals that combine to almost, but not exactly, a unison (1:1 ratio).

Examples

The most common comma pump is by the syntonic comma (81:80), arising from the difference between a ditone (two 9:8 intervals, combining to 81:64) and a (just) major third (5:4). Ascending by two tones and then descending by a major third shifts pitch upwards by 81:80, and similarly for other progressions (up a fifth, down a fourth, up a fifth, down a fourth, down a major third: C G D A E C). Study of the comma pump dates back at least to the sixteenth century when the Italian scientist Giovanni Battista Benedetti composed a piece of music to illustrate syntonic comma drift. See  for more.

Pythagorean comma

Going around the circle of fifths with just fifths results in a pump by the Pythagorean comma.

References

Commas (music)